Madeleine Roux is an American fiction author. She has written several young adult paranormal and horror fiction series, including the Asylum series. She has also written two standalone adult science fiction novels along with several novels for licensed properties such as World of Warcraft and Dungeons & Dragons.

Life and education 
Roux was born in Minnesota. Roux attended Beloit College, where she studied creative writing and acting and graduated with a bachelor's degree in 2008.

Career

Novels 
Roux became known for her zombie fiction blog, Allison Hewitt Is Trapped, which she turned into her first novel by the same name. Asylum, a 2013 young adult horror novel and first installment in the series of the same name, was a New York Times bestseller.

Her next young adult trilogy began with House of Furies in 2017. Kate McKean, in a review of the novel for Publishers Weekly, wrote that Roux "brings her gothic setting to rich life in this darkly delightful (and frequently gruesome) series opener". In February 2022, the Oklahoma attorney general's office announced a list of school library books, which included House of Furies, that they were reviewing for alleged obscenity. However, Attorney General John O'Connor walked back the probe within the day.

Both of her adult science fiction thriller and mystery novels – Salvaged (2019) and Reclaimed (2021) – received starred reviews from Publishers Weekly. Paste stated that Salvaged "is not for the faint of heart" and that "there are few worse ways to go out than what Roux has imagined for humanity in Salvaged".

In March 2022, Roux published the young adult horror novel The Book of Living Secrets. The Proposition, a Regency romance novel by Roux, is scheduled to be published in August 2022. In June 2022, it was announced that Quill Tree Books had acquired Now We Hunt the Doe, a young adult fantasy novel by Roux, along with an additional untitled novel. Now We Hunt the Doe is scheduled to be published in 2024.

Licensed properties 
Roux contributed the short story "Eclipse" to From a Certain Point of View, a 2017 anthology of stories in the Star Wars universe. Jennifer Roy, for CBR, commented that Roux's contribution "was the most devastating story in the collection because it showed Alderaan's fate from the point of view of Queen Breha Organa. [...]  'Eclipse' compounded the tragedy of Alderaan and made Leia's loss even more visceral".

Roux wrote two World of Warcraft novels, as well as the short story "A Moment In Verse". Shadows Rising, her second novel set in the Warcraft universe, was among Publishers Weekly bestsellers in July 2020. Roux is the author of the Dungeon Academy series, with illustrator Timothy Probert, which is a set of Dungeons & Dragons themed middle grade books; the second novel is scheduled for release in November 2022. A novel featuring characters from the series, titled Dungeons & Dragons: A Goblin Problem (2022), was published under Roux's pen name Diane Walker.

Roux is the author of a prequel novel, titled Critical Role: The Mighty Nein – The Nine Eyes of Lucien, set before Critical Role's second campaign; it was released in November 2022.

Bibliography

Historical romance 

 The Proposition (Dell, 2022) [upcoming]

Science fiction 
Salvaged (Ace, 2019)
Reclaimed (Ace, 2021)

Young adult fiction 

 The Book of Living Secrets (Quill Tree Books, 2022)
 Now We Hunt the Doe (Quill Tree Books, 2024) [upcoming]

Zombie 
Allison Hewitt Is Trapped (St. Martin's Publishing Group, 2011)
Sadie Walker is Stranded (St. Martin's Publishing Group, 2012)

Asylum 

Asylum (HarperCollins Publishers, 2013)
Sanctum (HarperCollins Publishers, 2014)
Catacomb (HarperCollins Publishers, 2015)
Escape from Asylum, prequel (HarperCollins Publishers, 2016)
The Asylum Novellas (HarperCollins Publishers, 2016); collects:
The Scarlets, novella (2014)
The Bone Artists, novella (2015)
The Warden, novella (2016)

House of Furies 
House of Furies (HarperTeen, 2017)
Court of Shadows (HarperTeen, 2018)
Tomb of Ancients (HarperTeen, 2019)

Licensed fiction

World of Warcraft 

The Shining Blade – World of Warcraft: Traveler, Book 3 (Scholastic Inc., 2019)
Shadows Rising – World of Warcraft: Shadowlands (Del Rey Books, 2020)
A Moment in Verse, digital short story (2021)

Dungeons & Dragons 

Dungeon Academy: No Humans Allowed! (HarperCollins Publishers, 2021)
Dungeons & Dragons: A Goblin Problem (HarperCollins Publishers, 2022)
Dungeon Academy: Tourney of Terror (HarperCollins Publishers, 2022) [upcoming]

Critical Role 

 Critical Role: The Mighty Nein – The Nine Eyes of Lucien (Del Rey Books, 2022)

Anthologies 

 From a Certain Point of View, "Eclipse" (Del Rey Books, 2017)
 Don't Turn Out the Lights, "The Tall Ones" (HarperCollins Publishers, 2020)

References

External links 
 
 instagram
 

21st-century American novelists
21st-century American short story writers
21st-century American women writers
American horror novelists
American science fiction writers
American thriller writers
American writers of young adult literature
Beloit College alumni
Living people
Women science fiction and fantasy writers
Women writers of young adult literature
Writers from Minnesota
Writers from Seattle
Year of birth missing (living people)